4th FFCC Awards 
January 9, 2000

Best Film: 
 Magnolia 
The 4th Florida Film Critics Circle Awards, given on 9 January 2000, honoured the best in film for 1999.

Winners
Best Actor: 
Kevin Spacey - American Beauty
Best Actress: 
Hilary Swank - Boys Don't Cry
Best Animated Film:
The Iron Giant
Best Cast: 
Magnolia
Best Cinematography: 
Snow Falling on Cedars and Bringing Out the Dead - Robert Richardson
Best Director: 
Sam Mendes - American Beauty
Best Film: 
Magnolia
Best Foreign Language Film: 
Run Lola Run (Lola rennt) • Germany
Best Newcomer: 
Spike Jonze - Being John Malkovich and Three Kings
Best Screenplay: 
Election - Alexander Payne and Jim Taylor
Best Supporting Actor: 
Haley Joel Osment - The Sixth Sense
Best Supporting Actress: 
Catherine Keener - Being John Malkovich

1
F